Gandhigram is a town in Tripura, India. located around 10 km from city centre Agartala. It comes under Sadar district. It has an old age home called Sandhyoneer.

Demographics
 India census, Gandhigram Census Town has population of 14,572 of which 7,928 are males while 6,644 are females.

Population of Children with age of 0-6 is 1575 which is 10.81% of total population of Gandhigram (CT). In Gandhigram Census Town, Female Sex Ratio is of 838 against state average of 960. Moreover Child Sex Ratio in Gandhigram is around 882 compared to Tripura state average of 957. Literacy rate of Gandhigram city is 91.79% higher than state average of 87.22%. In Gandhigram, Male literacy is around 94.88% while female literacy rate is 88.08%.

Politics
This town comes under Bamutia Assembly Constituency and West Tripura Lok Sabha Constituency.

References

Cities and towns in West Tripura district